Clavatula filograna is a species of sea snail, a marine gastropod mollusk in the family Clavatulidae.

Description
The shell grows to a length of 125 mm.

Distribution
This species occurs in the Atlantic Ocean along Angola.

References

External links
 

Endemic fauna of Angola
filograna
Gastropods described in 1923